Polylepion is a genus of wrasses native to the Pacific Ocean. It is also known as a bleeding wrasse. They are mostly found over sandy waters from Mexico to Nicaragua, including Cocos Island.

Species
The currently recognized species in this genus are:
 Polylepion cruentum M. F. Gomon, 1977 (bleeding wrasse)
 Polylepion russelli (M. F. Gomon & J. E. Randall, 1975)

References

 
Labridae
Marine fish genera